Jean-Nicolas-Gustave Van Nieuwen-Huysen (known as Gustave Vaëz) (6 December 1812 – 12 March 1862)  was a Belgian playwright, librettist and translator of opera librettos. Born in Brussels, he studied law and earned a doctorate at the State University of Leuven. Since he had no desire to work as a lawyer, he devoted himself to a career as a playwright. He published a large number of plays. His first plays were staged from 1829 to 1834 in Brussels, which he left for Paris to work with librettist Alphonse Royer. Operas where Vaëz was involved as a librettist and translator are Lucia di Lammermoor (1839), La favorite and Rita, ou Le mari battu by Gaetano Donizetti (1840), and Jérusalem by Giuseppe Verdi. He died in Paris on 12 March 1862.

Selected works
Mon parrain de Pontoise: comédie-vaudeville en un acte (1842)
Mademoiselle Rose: comédie en trois actes (1943)
Othello: opéra en trois actes (1844)
Robert Bruce: opéra en trois actes (1847)
Ne touchez pas à la reine: opéra en trois actes (1847)
Les fantaisies de milord: comédie-vaudeville en un acte (1850)
La dame de trèfle: vaudeville en un acte (1850)

References

External links

1812 births
1862 deaths
French librettists
Writers from Brussels
French male writers